Makrand Mehta (born 25 May 1931) is a social and business historian from Gujarat, India.

Biography
Makrand Mehta was born on 25 May 1931 at Ahmedabad in a Nagar Brahmin family.

He studied at the Maharaja Sayajirao University of Baroda, University of Pennsylvania and Gujarat University.

He headed the Department of History at the School of Sciences, Gujarat University before retirement. He is associated with several organisations including Gujarat Itihas Parishad, Gujarat Vidyasabha and Darshak Itihas Nidhi.

Works
Mehta has written more than 20 books in English and Gujarati. He has also published several papers on social and economic history.

His selected works are:

 The Ahmedabad Cotton Textile Industry : Genesis and Growth
 Urbanization in Western India : A Historical Perspective
 Business Houses in Western India : A Study in Entrepreneurial Response 1850-1956 (co-author)
 Regional Roots of Indian Nationalism
 Indian Merchants and Entrepreneurs in Historical Perspective: with Special Reference to Shroffs of Gujarat, 17th to 19th Centuries
 Merchants and ports of Gujarat
 History of International Trade and Customs Duties in Gujarat
 Gujarat-no Rajwadi Warso (Gujarati)
 Gujarat Ane Dariyo (Gujarati)
 Kasturbhai Lalbhai (Gujarati)
 Gujaratna Ghadvaiya: Swavikas ni Prayogshala (Gujarati)
 Itihas, Samaj ane Sahityama Gujarat (Gujarati)
 Hindu Varnavyavastha, Samaj Parivartan Ane Gujaratna Dalito (Gujarati)
 Sanstha Sthapan Ane Samaj Parivartan (Gujarati)

Reception 
Mehta published a research paper titled Sectarian literature and Social Consciousness - A study of the Swaminarayan sect 1800-1840 in December 1986 in Arhat. It  triggered a controversy among the followers of Swaminarayan Sampraday. In it, Mehta has contended that Sahajanand, who is believed to be an incarnation of Krishna by his followers, was only a social reformer who conspired with his followers to project himself as a god. He had also argued that the sect had done nothing for poor. In 1988, the followers of the sect received a permission from the government of Gujarat to lodge a case against him under section 295 A (Deliberate and malicious acts, intended to outrage religious feelings or any class by insulting its religion or religious beliefs) of Indian Penal Code.

Personal life
He has married a historian Shirin Mehta.

See also
 List of Gujarati-language writers

References

External links
 

1931 births
Living people
People from Gujarat
20th-century Indian historians
Indian business writers
Indian social sciences writers
Gujarat University alumni
Academic staff of Gujarat University
Maharaja Sayajirao University of Baroda alumni
University of Pennsylvania alumni
Gujarati-language writers
English-language writers from India